Senegalese National Olympic and Sports Committee (IOC code: SEN) is the National Olympic Committee representing Senegal.

References 

Senegal
Senegal at the Olympics